Christopher Beltram Hernandez "J. J." Yeley (born October 5, 1976) is an American professional stock car racing driver. He competes part-time in the  NASCAR Cup Series, driving the No. 15 Ford Mustang for Rick Ware Racing and the No. 80 Ford Mustang for Finish Line Motorsports Marketing.

He is one of only six drivers ever to win the USAC Triple Crown which includes the likes of Pancho Carter, Tony Stewart, Dave Darland, Jerry Coons Jr., and Tracy Hines.

Yeley is nicknamed "J. J." (Jimmy Jack) after his father and a close family friend.

Racing career

Open-wheel racing

Yeley won the 1997 edition of Indiana Sprintweek and captured the Rookie of the Year Award in the USAC National Sprint Car Series despite starting relatively few races.

In 1998, Yeley competed in four Indy Racing League (IRL) races, including the Indianapolis 500. His one Top 10 finish in these four races was at Indianapolis, where he finished 9th despite a spin on the first turn of the first lap, which nearly collected eventual race winner Eddie Cheever Jr.

Yeley also raced in the IRL in 2000 in an underfunded effort with McCormack Motorsports, but ultimately returned to USAC racing, picking up where he had left off by winning 2001 and 2003 National Sprint, 2002 and 2003 Silver Crown, and 2003 National Midget Series titles.

His championships in all three of USAC's top divisions in 2003 made him only the second driver, after Tony Stewart in 1995, to achieve the "Triple Crown" in a single season.  Stewart was the owner of the Sprint and Silver Crown cars in Yeley's 2003 season; the Midget which Yeley drove in 2003, Steve Lewis' No. 9, had been driven by Stewart in 1995.

Yeley scored 24 USAC wins in his 2003 season, breaking the previous record of 19 set by A. J. Foyt in 1961 and later tied by Sleepy Tripp (1988) and Jay Drake (2000).

NASCAR

2004–2007: Joe Gibbs Racing

As had Stewart, Yeley signed with Joe Gibbs Racing, starting 17 of 34 races in the 2004 NASCAR Busch Series and achieving four Top 10 finishes. He also competed in two Nextel Cup Series races in No. 11 car and the IROC series.  Yeley drove the full season in 2005 in the NASCAR Busch Series for Gibbs' No. 18 car, posting 12 Top 10 finishes and ending the season 11th in points. After the departure of Jason Leffler, who drove the No. 11 car in the Nextel Cup series, Yeley, Busch Series teammate Denny Hamlin, and Terry Labonte split the remaining races. Yeley drove four races, Labonte and Hamlin drove the final seven. Hamlin was named to drive the No. 11 FedEx-sponsored car for the 2006 season. Bobby Labonte made his announcement in November that he was leaving Joe Gibbs Racing. On November 12, at Phoenix International Raceway, Yeley was announced as the new driver for the No. 18 Interstate Batteries-sponsored Chevrolet.

Yeley ran full seasons with Joe Gibbs Racing in both the Nextel Cup and Busch Series in 2006. He drove the No. 18 Chevy in the Nextel Cup Series, and the No. 18 Vigoro/Home Depot-sponsored Chevrolet in the Busch Series. Yeley's best Nextel Cup finishes of 2006 came at California Speedway and Loudon, where he finished eighth; his best Busch Series finish came on June 17 at Kentucky Speedway. Yeley finished his 2006 season fifth in the Busch Series points standings with three poles, nine Top 5’s, and 22 Top 10's. In the 2006 Bank of America 500, Yeley was running on the top of the track when he decided to cut down the track to try to go to pit road. He ran right into Chase contender Mark Martin, and turned Mark head-on into the wall in a devastating crash. Martin's crew chief Pat Tryson had to be restrained by NASCAR officials as he showed his displeasure to Yeley, who also wrecked. The crash ended Mark Martin's championship hopes, as he was second in points before the incident. Despite racing for one of the best teams in the sport, Yeley would finish a dismal 29th in the points standings.

His 2007 season was filled with rumors about being released from Joe Gibbs Racing. At the 2007 Coca-Cola 600, Yeley scored a career-high second-place finish on a fuel gamble, with Casey Mears scoring the victory. Exactly three weeks later, at Michigan, Yeley took his first career pole at the Nextel Cup level, beating Jimmie Johnson by one-thousandth of a second (.001). During the middle of the 2007 season Joe Gibbs announced that his team would be switching to Toyota in 2008. Gibbs also announced that Yeley would not return for 2008. Gibbs ended up signing Kyle Busch to drive the No. 18.

2008–2012

Yeley moved to Hall of Fame Racing, an affiliate of JGR, replacing Tony Raines in the No. 96 DLP-sponsored Toyota. His struggles continued, as the team fell from being in the Top 35 every week with Raines behind the wheel to struggling to make races weekly (the team's first DNQ came with Yeley behind the wheel).

On July 5, he performed an in-race switch into the No. 20 car for an ill Tony Stewart. He ran strong for most of the race but was collected in two crashes within the last five laps and ended with a 20th-place finish. On August 6, 2008, Yeley was released from his contract to drive for Hall of Fame Racing, first by being replaced by P. J. Jones at Watkins Glen, Nationwide Series driver and Hall of Fame Racing test driver Brad Coleman at Michigan, and Ken Schrader for the remaining races. Yeley later stated that although there was an alliance with JGR, they were never truly involved in Hall-of-Fame's operations, and he was disappointed in not being allowed to improve the situation with the team. Yeley spent the rest of the season out of a ride. In 2009, he moved to the Camping World Truck Series, driving the No. 73 Chevrolet Silverado for Tagsby Racing. He was also named to take over the Mayfield Motorsports No. 41 Sprint Cup Series entry effective immediately following the indefinite suspension of owner/driver Jeremy Mayfield due to a substance abuse violation on May 9, 2009.

Later in 2009, Yeley broke three cervical vertebrae during a crash in a USAC race.

Yeley drove at Daytona in 2010 for Daisy Ramirez Motorsports in the Camping World Truck Series. This was the team's debut and he finished a career-best 10th after starting 36th. Yeley was announced as the driver for the Whitney Motorsports No. 46 Sprint Cup Series car on May 4, 2010. On May 7, he qualified the No. 46 into the Showtime Southern 500 at Darlington. Yeley qualified for nine of the fourteen races he attempted. At the Coke Zero 400, he finished a team-best 19th. Yeley also raced for Latitude 43 Motorsports in Phoenix and Tommy Baldwin Racing, plus drove for Richard Petty Motorsports in a relief role at Charlotte, replacing a sick Kasey Kahne.

Yeley raced his way in the 2011 Daytona 500 in the Gatorade Duels for Whitney Motorsports, a team that failed to qualify for the 2010 event. He finished 43rd in the event after a blown engine eleven laps into the race. At Loudon, Yeley drove the No. 38 Front Row Motorsports entry in place of Travis Kvapil, who was unable to make the race due to his Truck Series commitments. He ran the remainder of the season in a fourth Front Row entry, the No. 55, with occasional races in the No. 38.

For 2012, Yeley signed with Robinson-Blakeney Racing to drive the No. 49 Toyota in the Sprint Cup Series. He also drove the team's No. 28 Nationwide Series car in that series' season-opening race at Daytona. Halfway through the season, Yeley moved to Max Q Motorsports to drive the No. 37 in a partnership with Tommy Baldwin Racing.  Both the No. 49 and the No. 37 were mostly start and park efforts.

2013-2019

In 2013, Yeley moved to Tommy Baldwin Racing to drive the No. 36 Chevrolet, with a sponsorship from Golden Corral at races on superspeedways. United Mining, Accell Construction, and several other companies also served as primary sponsor throughout the season.  Yeley finished 10th in his TBR debut in the Daytona 500, his first Top 10 since 2008. Yeley ran his first full season (in a non-start and park ride) for the first time since 2008, and finished 32nd in points. He was replaced by Reed Sorenson for 2014.

On February 13, it was announced that Yeley would drive the No. 44 with Xxxtreme Motorsport starting at Phoenix. In late-April, the team purchased the No. 30 team from Swan Racing, with Yeley shifting to drive the new car number. Yeley replaced Ryan Truex in the No. 83 BK Racing Toyota at the Pure Michigan 400 after Truex suffered a concussion during a practice session.  He later drove the team's start and park No. 93 at Richmond, and ran the last seven races in the 83 following Truex's dismissal from the team.

In 2015, Yeley moved to BK Racing full-time, replacing Alex Bowman in the No. 23 Toyota. He also ran full-time in the Xfinity Series for No. 28 Toyota for JGL Racing, whom he had joined partway through the 2014 season. Before Darlington, Yeley and BK Racing teammate Jeb Burton switched rides with Burton moving to the No. 23, while Yeley moved to the No. 26.

In 2016, Yeley had no rides for the Daytona weekend. However, on February 24, 2016, it was announced that Yeley will drive the No. 14 Toyota Camry for TriStar Motorsports in the Xfinity Series, starting at Atlanta. Yeley replaced David Starr in the No. 44 at Richmond due to Starr being sidelined with an illness; Yeley eventually took over the ride full-time.

For the 2017 O'Reilly Auto Parts 500 at Texas, Yeley made his return to the Cup Series, driving the No. 7 Chevrolet SS for Tommy Baldwin Racing, a team he last drove for in 2013. After starting 27th, he finished in the same position, four laps down.
In 2017, Yeley returned to the No. 14 of TriStar for the full season and a part-time schedule in the No. 7 for Tommy Baldwin Racing. On July 22, TriStar owner Mark Smith died, and the next week, Yeley finished a season-best sixth at Iowa Speedway.

In March 2018, Yeley drove the No. 55 car for Premium Motorsports in the STP 500 in the Cup Series, where he finished 31st. Two months later, Yeley joined NY Racing Team (formerly Xxxtreme Motorsport) for the Coca-Cola 600, driving the No. 7. In the 600, Yeley qualified 40th and finished 38th after retiring from the event on lap 191 with a fuel pump issue.

In the summer of 2018, Yeley made his return to the No. 23 car which was previously owned by his former team BK Racing. NY Racing, for several races, fielded the No. 23 in coordination with BK, sharing the No. 23 charter and the Steakhouse Elite sponsorship. After BK's bankruptcy auction, Front Row Motorsports was awarded BK's assets and NY Racing continued their collaboration with Front Row to the season's end before both teams parted ways.

For 2019, NY Racing planned to field the No. 7 Steakhouse Elite-sponsored Ford Mustang with Yeley as the driver for an undetermined number of races. Before the team formally entered any races, Yeley and Steakhouse Elite partnered with Rick Ware Racing for the Pocono 400 in June. In August, he debuted Ware's No. 54 car at Bristol. On November 14, RWR announced Yeley would race full-time for the team in the 2020 NASCAR Cup Series season.

2020-present

Yeley failed to qualify for the 2020 Daytona 500 after finishing 21st in Duel 2 of the 2020 Bluegreen Vacations Duels. In August, he switched to Truck points in order to run the Dover Triple Truck Challenge race with Reaume Brothers Racing.

Just as was the case in 2016 and 2019, Yeley was without a ride in any of the three series for the season-opening races at Daytona in 2021. His first start of the season did not come until two weeks later at Homestead, where he returned to Rick Ware Racing in their No. 17 Xfinity Series car, now fielded in a partnership with SS-Green Light Racing, the same partnership the SSGLR No. 07 had in 2020 when he and other RWR drivers drove it. On March 4, 2021, it was announced that Yeley would be driving the No. 66 Cup Series car for MBM Motorsports in select races throughout the season with new sponsorship from Diamondback Land Surveying, which he brought to the team. However, Yeley confirmed in a tweet the following day that (despite helping the team land that sponsor), he would not be driving the car and for the team in any races. Despite this announcement, he would drive at the 2021 South Point 400 in the No. 66 with sponsorship from FatBoy Ice Cream.

In 2022, Yeley attempted to race the 2022 Daytona 500 driving the No. 55 for MBM Motorsports with sponsorship from HEX.com, but failed to qualify. Instead, he would attempt the entire 2022 Xfinity Series season driving the No. 66 full-time for MBM. He managed to qualify the No. 55 for MBM at Talladega. He had also made numerous starts for the No. 15 for Rick Ware Racing. He achieved his first Top 10 finish for MBM, finishing eighth at Portland. He ran the No. 13 at Nashville and DNQed the No. 66 at Road America and IRC. At Michigan, Yeley triggered a massive pileup on lap 25 that took Austin Cindric and Kyle Busch out of contention. Yeley drove the Rick Ware Racing No. 51 at the Charlotte Roval race as a substitute for Cody Ware, who broke his ankle in a crash at Texas.

Motorsports career results

American open-wheel racing
(key)

IndyCar

NASCAR
(key) (Bold – Pole position awarded by qualifying time. Italics – Pole position earned by points standings or practice time. * – Most laps led.)

Cup Series

Daytona 500

Xfinity Series

Camping World Truck Series

Featherlite Modified Tour

 Season still in progress 
 Ineligible for series points 
 Yeley switched to Nationwide Series points before the race at Auto Club Speedway 
 Yeley switched to Truck Series points before the race at Dover International Speedway

ARCA Re/Max Series
(key) (Bold – Pole position awarded by qualifying time. Italics – Pole position earned by points standings or practice time. * – Most laps led.)

International Race of Champions
(key) (Bold – Pole position. * – Most laps led.)

References

External links

 
 

Living people
1976 births
Racing drivers from Phoenix, Arizona
Indianapolis 500 drivers
NASCAR drivers
ARCA Menards Series drivers
International Race of Champions drivers
IndyCar Series drivers
Joe Gibbs Racing drivers
USAC Silver Crown Series drivers